Accession of Montenegro to the European Union is on the current agenda for future enlargement of the EU.

Shortly after voting for independence from the State Union of Serbia and Montenegro in a referendum in 2006, Montenegro began the process of accession to the European Union by agreeing to a Stabilisation and Association Agreement with the EU, which officially came into force on 1 May 2010.

Montenegro officially applied to join the EU on 15 December 2008, and membership negotiations began on 29 June 2012.  With all the negotiating chapters opened, the country enjoys a widespread support among EU members' officials, and accession of the country to the EU is considered possible by 2025.

History
Note: This section covers the relationship between Montenegro and the EU since Montenegro's potential candidate status was granted.

Identification
Montenegro was granted potential candidate status in December 2002, when it was still in a union with Serbia.  The country's European Perspective was recognized by the EU in June of 2006 at the Thessaloniki Summit.

Recommendation
The European Commission recommended Montenegro as candidate country on 9 November 2010.

Candidacy
Montenegro officially was granted candidate status on 17 December 2010.

Membership application
Montenegro officially applied to join the EU on 15 December 2008.

Questionnaire
On 23 April 2009, the Council invited the European Commission to submit its opinion on the application. The Commission presented Montenegro with a questionnaire to assess its application on 22 July 2009.  On 9 December 2009, Montenegro delivered its answers to the EC questionnaire.  In 2010, the Commission issued a favourable opinion on Montenegro's application, identifying seven key priorities that would need to be addressed for negotiations to begin.

Treaties and NATO

Stabilisation and Association Agreement
The State Union of Serbia and Montenegro started the process of Accession to the European Union in November 2005, when negotiations over a Stabilisation and Association Agreement began.  Such agreements were concluded by the EU with states that have expressed a wish to become members.  In exchange for commitments to political, economic, trade, or human rights reform in the country, it may be offered tariff-free access to some or all EU markets (industrial goods, agricultural products, etc.), and financial or technical assistance.  In May 2006, Montenegro voted for independence in a referendum and the State Union of Serbia and Montenegro was dissolved. Serbia continued with the existing SAA negotiations, and separate negotiations were launched with Montenegro in September 2006.  The Agreement was initialled on 15 March 2007, and officially signed on 15 October 2007.  After all the 27 member-states of EU had ratified the SAA, it came into force on 1 May 2010.

Accession to NATO

Montenegro officially joined NATO on 5 June 2017.

EU programs and organisations
Eastern Partnership: 22 January 2007

Energy Community: joined 15 December 2006

European Network of Transmission System Operators for Electricity:

Public opinion
Montenegro's population is overwhelmingly pro-EU, with 76.2% being in favour according to polling and only 9.8% against, in October 2009.

Negotiations
In December 2011, the Council agreed to launch the accession process, with negotiations beginning on 29 June 2012.

With all the negotiating chapters opened, the country enjoys a widespread support among EU members' officials, and accession of the country to the EU is considered possible by 2025. In its 2016 assessment of the accession progress, European Commission has identified Montenegro as having the highest level of preparation for membership among the negotiating states. Until 2020, Montenegro had received €507 million of developmental aid from the Instrument for Pre-Accession Assistance, a funding mechanism for EU candidate countries.

Montenegro is experiencing ecological, judicial and crime-related problems that may hinder its bid. Montenegro signed an agreement with the Bulgarian government in December 2007 in which Bulgaria will assist Montenegro with its Euro-Atlantic and EU integration for the following three years. To work on these matters the Ministry of Foreign Affairs and European Integration of Montenegro has a special agency dedicated to accession to the EU, the Office for assistance to the Chief Negotiator. The goal of the office is to support the task of the Chief Negotiator for Montenegro's Accession to EU, Zorka Kordić. On 27 July 2010, the Parliament passed a non-discrimination law that includes sexual orientation and gender identity as prohibited grounds of discrimination. This was one of the requirements the country had to meet for EU membership.

There are currently thirty chapters opened, three chapters that have been provisionally closed, and two chapters in which there is nothing to adopt.

Economy

Developmental Aid
Instrument for Pre-Accession Assistance

IPA I  €236 M  (2007-2013)

IPA II  €271 M  (2014-2020)

IPA III  c. €300 M  (2021-2027)

Unilateral euro adoption

Montenegro has no currency of its own.  As a constituent republic of the Socialist Federal Republic of Yugoslavia following World War II, and later of the Federal Republic of Yugoslavia, Montenegro used the Yugoslav dinar as its official currency. In November 1999, the government of Montenegro unilaterally designated the Deutsche Mark as its co-official currency with the dinar, and on 1 January 2001 the dinar officially ceased to be a legal tender in Montenegro. When the euro was introduced and the Deutsche Mark yielded in 2002, Montenegro followed suit and began using the euro as well, with no objection from the European Central Bank (ECB).

The European Commission and the ECB have since voiced their discontent over Montenegro's unilateral use of the euro on several occasions. A statement attached to their Stabilisation and Association Agreement with the EU read: "unilateral introduction of the euro was not compatible with the Treaty." The EU insists on the strict adherence to convergence criteria (such as spending at least 2 years in the ERMII system) which are not negotiable before euro adoption, but have not intervened to stop the unilateral adoption of the euro by Montenegro in 2002. The issue is expected to be resolved through the negotiations process. The ECB has stated that the implications of unilateral euro adoption "would be spelled out at the latest in the event of possible negotiations on EU accession."

Diplomats have suggested that it's unlikely Montenegro will be forced to withdraw the euro from circulation in their country. Radoje Žugić, Montenegro's Minister of Finance, has stated that "it would be extremely economically irrational to return to our own currency and then later to again go back to the euro." Instead, he hopes that Montenegro will be permitted to keep the euro and has promised "the government of Montenegro, will adopt some certain elements, which should fulfil the conditions for further use of the euro; such as adopting fiscal rules."

Travel

Schengen Visa liberalisation process
On 1 January 2008, the visa facilitation and readmission agreements between Montenegro and the EU entered into force. Montenegro was added to the list of visa exempt nationals on 19 December 2009, allowing their citizens to enter the Schengen Area, Bulgaria, Cyprus and Romania without a visa when traveling with biometric passports. Visa liberalisation process does not include travels to Ireland as this country operates its own respective visa regime outside of the Schengen Agreement. The same applied for the travels to the United Kingdom, which left the EU during Montenegro's accession process.

Impact of joining

See also
 Montenegro–NATO relations
 Yugoslavia and the European Economic Community
 Accession of Serbia to the European Union

References

Montenegro
Montenegro–European Union relations